Peda Waltair is a residential locality situated at the northern part of Visakhapatnam, India.

Etymology 
The name Peda Waltair is derived from Waltair, the name of a British officer who worked as a collector in Visakhapatnam in the 18th century.

See also
Government TB and Chest Hospital, Visakhapatnam

References

Neighbourhoods in Visakhapatnam